Sidhant Singh (born 1 January 2000) is a Singaporean cricketer. In October 2018, he was named in Singapore's squad for the 2018 ICC World Cricket League Division Three tournament in Oman. He played in Singapore's second fixture of the tournament, against Denmark on 12 November 2018. In September 2019, he was named in Singapore's squad for the 2019 Malaysia Cricket World Cup Challenge League A tournament. He made his List A debut for Singapore, against Denmark, in the 2019 Malaysia Cricket World Cup Challenge League A tournament on 19 September 2019.

Later in September 2019, he was named in Singapore's Twenty20 International (T20I) squad for the 2019–20 Singapore Tri-Nation Series. He made his T20I debut for Singapore, against Nepal, in the Singapore Tri-Nation Series on 28 September 2019. In October 2019, he was named in Singapore's squad for the 2019 ICC T20 World Cup Qualifier tournament in the United Arab Emirates.

References

External links
 

2000 births
Living people
Singaporean cricketers
Singapore Twenty20 International cricketers
Singaporean sportspeople of Indian descent